Glenea dejeani is a species of beetle in the family Cerambycidae. It was described by Charles Joseph Gahan in 1889. It is known from Sumatra and Java.

Varietas
 Glenea dejeani var. conjunctemaculata Breuning, 1956
 Glenea dejeani var. rubidofemoralis Breuning, 1956

References

dejeani
Beetles described in 1889